Coon Hunter is an unincorporated community  in Snyder County, Pennsylvania, United States.

References

Unincorporated communities in Snyder County, Pennsylvania
Unincorporated communities in Pennsylvania